Bao River, Baohe, or Baoshui is a river in southern Shaanxi Province, China. The average annual flow is about 50 cubic meters per second.

References

Rivers of Shaanxi